Climbing French Championships are annual national championships for competition climbing organised by the French Federation of Mountaineering and Climbing (FFME). The first championships was held in 1988 with only lead events.

Lead

Bouldering

Speed

Combined

References 

 ffme.fr: results 1988–2006
 ffme.fr: results 2017
 ffme.fr: results 2018

Climbing competitions